Francis Fane KC (c. 1698 – 28 May 1757) of Brympton d'Evercy, near Yeovil, Somerset, and later Wormsley, Oxfordshire was a Commissioner for Trade and the Plantations, and a British Member of Parliament.

Early life
Francis Fane was the eldest son of Henry Fane, a Bristol merchant. He was educated at King's College, Cambridge, graduating in 1715, after which he attended the Middle Temple and was called to the bar in 1721. As the eldest son he succeeded in 1726 to his father's estate. The next year he became a King's Counsellor and a Middle Temple bencher. He was appointed standing council to the Board of Trade and Plantations in 1725, a position he held until 1746. In 1731 he bought the estate at Brympton d'Evercy from the Receiver General.

Parliamentary career
He initially represented Taunton in Somersetshire in the parliament which first sat for business on 27 January 1728 (N.S.).  He also represented the same seat in the parliament summoned to meet on 13 June 1734 and then represented Petersfield in that summoned to meet on 25 June 1741.

He was also Solicitor-General to Queen Caroline between 13 May 1729 and her death in 1737, and chairman of the ways and means committee between 1739 and 1751. In 1746, being constituted one of the commissioners for the Board of Trade and the Plantations, he was re-elected to the parliament which first sat on business on 12 November 1747, representing Ilchester. He inherited some estates from his maternal uncle John Scrope in 1752. He resigned his place as a Commissioner of Trade and the Plantations in April 1756.

He died unmarried on 28 May 1757, aged fifty-nine, serving as the member for Lyme Regis and was buried at Lewknor in Oxfordshire.

Family
Fane's father was a great-grandson of Francis Fane, 1st Earl of Westmorland. His younger brother and heir, Thomas, inherited the Earldom of Westmorland on the death of the 7th earl in 1762. His youngest brother was Henry Fane of Wormsley.

Notes

References

Attribution

Year of birth uncertain
1757 deaths
Alumni of King's College, Cambridge
British MPs 1727–1734
British MPs 1734–1741
British MPs 1741–1747
British MPs 1747–1754
British MPs 1754–1761
Members of the Middle Temple
Members of the Parliament of Great Britain for English constituencies
Tory MPs (pre-1834)
Francis